Le Trétien railway station is a railway station in the municipality of Salvan, in the Swiss canton of Valais. It is located on the  gauge Martigny–Châtelard line of Transports de Martigny et Régions.

Services 
 the following services stop at Le Trétien:

References

External links 
 
 

Railway stations in the canton of Valais
Transports de Martigny et Régions stations